Thénia is a town and commune in Algeria.

It may also refer to:

Places
 Thénia Cemetery, a muslim cemetery in Algeria.
 Thénia Dam, an hydraulic dam in Algeria.
 Thénia District, a district in Algeria.

History
 Battle of Thénia (1837), a battle during the French conquest of Algeria.
 Battle of Thénia (1846), a battle during the French conquest of Algeria.
 Battle of Thénia (1871), a battle during the Mokrani Revolt of Algeria.
 2008 Thénia bombing, a terrorist attack in Algeria.
 2012 Thénia bombing, a terrorist attack in Algeria.

Sport
 CMB Thénia, a football club in Algeria.

Thénia